I. A. C. Pillai is an Indian politician and former Member of the Legislative Assembly. He was elected to the Tamil Nadu legislative assembly as an Indian National Congress candidate from Tenkasi constituency in 1967 election.

References 

Indian National Congress politicians from Tamil Nadu
Possibly living people
Year of birth missing